This is a list of Legislative Assembly results for the 2020 Australian Capital Territory general election.

Results summary

|-

|}

Results by electorate

Brindabella

Ginninderra

Kurrajong

Murrumbidgee

Yerrabi

See also
 List of Australian Capital Territory elections

References

2020